Lars Holme Larsen is a Danish designer, known for founding Danish industrial design studio Kilo Design and co-founding Danish design collaboration KiBiSi with Bjarke Ingels and Jens Martin Skibsted.

Lars Larsen is a graduate of the Royal Danish Academy of Fine Arts. Alongside his design practice, he is a member of the Danish Design Council and has served on a number of award juries, including D&AD, core77 and Cannes Lions. His work is included in SFMOMA’s permanent collection, and he has received numerous awards and honours over the years, including the Danish Design Award, Red Dot, Good Design Award, IDEA Award and a Cannes Lions golden trophy.

References

http://kilodesign.dk/

External links
 "KiBiSi". KiBiSi.com. https://web.archive.org/web/20101102115436/http://www.kibisi.com/about. Retrieved 2010-10-28.
 "Kilo". Kilo.com. http://www.kilodesign.dk/. Retrieved 2010-10-28. 
 "KiBiSi: A New Danish Product-Design Supergroup". Fast Company. http://www.fastcompany.com/tag/lars-holme-larsen. Retrieved 2010-10-28.

Danish industrial designers
Living people
Year of birth missing (living people)